Parliamentary elections were held in Greece on 23 September 1879. Supporters of Alexandros Koumoundouros and Theodoros Deligiannis emerged as the largest bloc in Parliament, with 100 of the 207 seats. Koumoundouros remained Prime Minister until 22 March the following year.

Results

References

Greece
Parliamentary elections in Greece
1879 in Greece
Greece
1870s in Greek politics
Charilaos Trikoupis